Nino Schurter (born 13 May 1986) is a Swiss cross-country cyclist who races for the SCOTT-SRAM MTB Racing Team.

Schurter won the world championship in men's cross-country in 2009, 2012, 2013, 2015, 2016, 2017, 2018, 2019, 2021 and 2022 and the overall UCI World Cup in 2010, 2012, 2013, 2015, 2017, 2018, 2019 and 2022 and thus become the first man to hold 8 World Cup overall titles. He won the gold medal in mountain biking at the 2016 Olympics, the silver medal 2012 Olympics and the bronze medal at the 2008 Olympics. He won the Swiss National Championship in cross-country mountain biking in 2012, 2013, 2014, 2015. He joined  for a number of road races during the 2014 season.

Career
Nino Schurter was born and grew up in Tersnaus, Lumnezia in the Romansch-speaking part of Switzerland. He spent a lot of his free time in nature playing different sports and quickly got fascinated by mountain biking. He took part in the Swiss racing competition Swisspower cup where he won his first victories. In 2003, he became a member of the professional team of Thomas Frischknecht and he turned professional in 2007 when he joined the SCOTT-SRAM MTB Racing Team (former SCOTT-Odlo MTB Racing and even earlier SWISSPOWER).

He currently rides a Scott Spark RC World cup EVO.

2004
In his first junior international competition on 31 July in Wałbrzych, Poland, Nino Schurter finished first at the European Championships.

2012
2012 was one of Schurter's most successful season when he won 11 out of 15 races. He won his first World Cup of the season on 18 March in Pietermaritzburg on a bike with 650B or 27.5-inch wheels. On 13 May, he won his second World Cup on his 26th birthday in Nove Mesto na Morave. On 28 July, after his fourth individual win, Schurter won the overall World Cup series title in Val d'Isère.

On 15 September 2011, Schurter qualified for the 2012 Olympics where he won the silver medal after being beaten in a final sprint on the line by Jaroslav Kulhavý. On 8 September 2012, he won his second World Championships title in Saalbach, Austria, where he shared the podium with two of his countrymen Lukas and Matthias Flückiger.

2013
On 2 September 2013, Schurter won his third World Championship title in Pietermaritzburg, South Africa, on one of his favourite cross-country courses.

2014
Schurter joined the Australian road race cycling team Orica–GreenEDGE during the 2014 season. He took part in the Tour de Romandie and the Tour de Suisse.

In the 2014, mountain bike season, he lost his World Cup and World Championships titles. He finished in second place in Hafjell, Norway and ended up his season behind Julien Absalon at the World Cup in Méribel.

2015
In 2015, Schurter fully committed to his mountain bike career as he had the 2016 Olympics in Rio on his agenda for the next two years. He competed in the 2015 European Games for Switzerland, in mountain biking. He won the gold medal in the event.

2016
Schurter won his fifth world championship in men's cross-country at the 2016 UCI Mountain Bike & Trials World Championships at Nové Město, Czech Republic. This equaled the record of Julien Absalon, who has also won five titles in the event. At the 2016 Summer Olympic, he won the gold medal, finishing before Jaroslav Kulhavý and Carlos Coloma Nicolás.

2017 Perfect season
In March 2017, Schurter won the Absa Cape Epic – the eight-day South African stage race – for the first time. Riding with Scott-Sram teammate Matthias Stirnemann in the two-man team format they won by eight minutes from pre-race favorites Christoph Sauser and Jaroslav Kulhavý (Investec Songo Specialized). Schurter had completed the Cape Epic three times previously. This was his first win. He went on to win all six rounds of the World Cup and accomplished as first male a Perfect season, as well as his sixth world championship.

Major results

2004
 UCI World Junior Championships
1st  Cross-country
2nd  Team relay
 1st  Cross-country, UEC European Junior Championships
2005
 1st  Cross-country, National Under-23 Championships
 3rd  Cross-country, UCI World Under-23 Championships
2006
 UCI World Championships
1st  Team relay
1st  Under-23 Cross-country
 1st  Cross-country, UEC European Under-23 Championships
2007
 UCI World Championships
1st  Team relay
2nd  Under-23 Cross-country
 1st  Cross-country, UEC European Under-23 Championships
 2nd Cross-country, National Under-23 Championships
 UCI XCO World Cup
3rd Champery
 8th Overall Grand Prix Guillaume Tell
2008
 UCI World Championships
1st  Under-23 Cross-country
2nd  Team relay
 1st  Cross-country, UEC European Under-23 Championships
 UCI XCO World Cup
2nd Houffalize
2nd Fort William
 Swisspower Cup
2nd Winterthur
3rd Buchs
 3rd  Cross-country, Olympic Games
2009
 1st  Cross-country, UCI World Championships
2010
 1st  Overall UCI XCO World Cup
1st Dalby Forest
1st Val di Sole
2nd Offenburg
2nd Windham
3rd Champéry
2011
 UCI World Championships
2nd  Cross-country
2nd  Team relay
 2nd Overall UCI XCO World Cup
1st Pietermaritzburg
2nd Mont-Sainte-Anne
2nd Windham
2nd Nové Město
2nd Val d'Isère
2012
 1st  Cross-country, UCI World Championships
 1st  Cross-country, National Championships
 1st  Overall UCI XCO World Cup
1st Pietermaritzburg
1st Nové Město
1st Mont-Sainte-Anne
1st Val d'Isère
2nd Houffalize
 2nd  Cross-country, Olympic Games
2013
 1st  Cross-country, UCI World Championships
 1st  Cross-country, National Championships
 1st  Overall UCI XCO World Cup
1st Nové Město
1st Val di Sole
1st Vallnord
2nd Hafjell
3rd Mont-Sainte-Anne
 2nd  Cross-country, UEC European Championships
2014
 1st  Cross-country, National Championships
 UCI World Championships
2nd  Cross-country
2nd  Team relay
 2nd Overall UCI XCO World Cup
1st Nové Město
1st Mont-Sainte-Anne
1st Windham
1st Méribel
2nd Albstadt
2015
 1st  Cross-country, UCI World Championships
 1st  Cross-country, European Games
 1st  Cross-country, National Championships
 1st  Overall UCI XCO World Cup
1st Mont-Sainte-Anne
1st Windham
1st Val di Sole
2nd Nové Město
2nd Albstadt
2nd Lenzerheide
2016
 1st  Cross-country, Olympic Games
 1st  Cross-country, UCI World Championships
 1st  Cross-country, National Championships
 2nd Overall UCI XCO World Cup
1st Cairns
1st Albstadt
1st Lenzerheide
2017
 UCI World Championships
1st  Cross-country
1st  Team relay
 1st  Cross-country, National Championships
 1st  Overall Cape Epic (with Matthias Stirnemann)
 1st  Overall UCI XCO World Cup
1st Nové Město
1st Albstadt
1st Vallnord
1st Lenzerheide
1st Mont-Sainte-Anne
1st Val di Sole
2018
 UCI World Championships
1st  Cross-country
1st  Team relay
 1st  Overall Outcast Rider, Cape Epic
 1st  Overall UCI XCO World Cup
1st Nové Město
1st Albstadt
1st Val di Sole
1st La Bresse
2nd Stellenbosch
2nd Vallnord
 UCI XCC World Cup
2nd Val di Sole
3rd Nové Město
2019
 UCI World Championships
1st  Cross-country
1st  Team relay
 1st  Cross-country, National Championships
 1st  Overall Cape Epic (with Lars Forster)
 1st  Overall UCI XCO World Cup
1st Vallnord
1st Les Gets
2nd Nové Město
2nd Lenzerheide
2nd Snowshoe
3rd Val di Sole
 UCI XCC World Cup
1st Snowshoe
2nd Vallnord
3rd Albstadt
3rd Lenzerheide
 Swiss Bike Cup
1st Solothurn
2nd Lugano
 Internazionali d'Italia Series
3rd Monte Titano
2020
 1st  Cross-country, UEC European Championships
 1st  Cross-country, National Championships
 1st  Overall Swiss Epic (with Lars Forster)
 Swiss Bike Cup
1st Leukerbad
 UCI XCO World Cup
3rd Nové Město II
2021
 1st  Cross-country, UCI World Championships
 UCI XCO World Cup
2nd Albstadt
2nd Lenzerheide
 Internazionali d'Italia Series
2nd Andora
2nd Nalles
 UCI XCC World Cup
3rd Albstadt
2022
 UCI World Championships
1st  Cross-country
1st  Team relay
 1st  Overall UCI XCO World Cup
1st Petrópolis
2nd Albstadt
2nd Leogang
2nd Val di Sole
3rd Nové Město
3rd Vallnord
 UCI XCC World Cup
3rd Albstadt

UCI World Cup results

References

External links
 
 
 
 
 

1986 births
Living people
Swiss male cyclists
Cyclists at the 2008 Summer Olympics
Cyclists at the 2012 Summer Olympics
Cyclists at the 2016 Summer Olympics
Olympic cyclists of Switzerland
Olympic silver medalists for Switzerland
Olympic bronze medalists for Switzerland
Cross-country mountain bikers
People from Surselva District
Olympic medalists in cycling
Medalists at the 2016 Summer Olympics
Medalists at the 2012 Summer Olympics
Medalists at the 2008 Summer Olympics
UCI Mountain Bike World Champions (men)
European Games gold medalists for Switzerland
European Games medalists in cycling
Cyclists at the 2015 European Games
Cape Epic winners
Olympic gold medalists for Switzerland
Swiss mountain bikers
Cyclists at the 2020 Summer Olympics
Sportspeople from Graubünden